Kim Hyo-min (born 8 December 1995 ) is a South Korean badminton player. Although she now specializes in singles, Kim's first big result in a major international junior event came when she and fellow singles specialist Lee Min-ji reached the girls' doubles semi-finals at the 2012 World Junior Championships. The following year, she was undefeated in South Korea's run to winning the Suhandinata Cup at the 2013 World Junior Championships. In 2014, Kim beat Sun Yu to reach the final of the 2014 Macau Open Grand Prix Gold, and she became the runner-up after defeated by P. V. Sindhu in the final round.

Achievements

BWF World Junior Championships 
Girls' doubles

BWF Grand Prix 
The BWF Grand Prix had two levels, the Grand Prix and Grand Prix Gold. It was a series of badminton tournaments sanctioned by the Badminton World Federation (BWF) and played between 2007 and 2017.

Women's singles

  BWF Grand Prix Gold tournament
  BWF Grand Prix tournament

BWF International Challenge/Series 
Women's singles

  BWF International Challenge tournament
  BWF International Series tournament

References

External links 
 

1995 births
Living people
Sportspeople from Ulsan
South Korean female badminton players
Badminton players at the 2014 Asian Games
Asian Games silver medalists for South Korea
Asian Games medalists in badminton
Medalists at the 2014 Asian Games
Universiade gold medalists for South Korea
Universiade medalists in badminton
Medalists at the 2015 Summer Universiade
21st-century South Korean women